Clotilda Adessa Douglas-Yakimchuk  (née Coward; January 11, 1932April 15, 2021) was a Canadian nurse. She was the first African-Canadian to graduate from the Nova Scotia Hospital School of Nursing and the first black president of the Registered Nurses’ Association of Nova Scotia.

Early life and education
Clotilda Adessa Douglas-Yakimchuk was born Clotilda Adessa Coward in Whitney Pier, Nova Scotia, to Arthur and Lillian (Blackman) Coward. Growing up, her family dealt with racism while living in Whitney Pier. Her father was forced to quit his job at the steel plant due to discrimination, and her sister was unable to find a job.

In 1954, Coward became the first black graduate of the Nova Scotia Hospital School of Nursing. She would later earn her post graduate psychiatric nursing certificate from the Nova Scotia Hospital. She earned her Diploma in Adult Education from Saint Francis Xavier University.

Career
After earning her nursing qualifications, Coward Douglas began her career at the Nova Scotia Hospital as Head Nurse of the Admission/Discharge Unit. Shortly thereafter, Coward and her first husband Benson Douglas moved to Grenada, West Indies, where she served as a Director in a mental health hospital. This was also where she earned her post graduate midwifery diploma from Colony Hospital in Grenada, West Indies. By 1967, Coward Douglas moved back to Canada and accepted a position as Staff Nurse at the Sydney City Hospital. A few years later, she became the first black person to be elected president of the Registered Nurses Association of Nova Scotia. During this time, Douglas-Yakimchuk also founded the Black Community Development Organization and advocated for Cape Breton University to create a nursing degree program. She retired as director of education services at the Cape Breton Regional Hospital in Sydney in 1994.

Personal life and death

After graduating from the NSHSN, Coward Douglas met and married Grenadian-born Benson T. Douglas in 1955, who wanted to return home to make a contribution after graduating at the top of his class in 1954 from Dalhousie University with an undergraduate degree in law. Together they had 5 children, Carl, Valerie, Kendrick, Sharon, and Leslie. 
 
The couple later separated and Douglas went back to Grenada and became a judge before his death in January 1975. 
 
In 1984 she married Dan Yakimchuk. They were married for 27 years until his death in March 2011.
 
After retiring, Douglas-Yakimchuk moved to Halifax, Nova Scotia, to be closer to her family. She died from COVID-19  in Halifax on April 15, 2021, at the age of 89, during the COVID-19 pandemic in Nova Scotia.

Awards and honours
In 1991, Douglas-Yakimchuk was the recipient of the Harry Jerome Award for her cultural and community achievements. In 2003, she was appointed a Member of the Order of Canada. In 2010, she received her Honorary Doctor of Laws from  Cape Breton University. In 2018, Douglas-Yakimchuk was appointed a Member of the Order of Nova Scotia.

References 

2021 deaths
1932 births
Black Nova Scotians
Canadian nurses
Members of the Order of Canada
Members of the Order of Nova Scotia
Black Canadian women
Canadian women nurses
People from the Cape Breton Regional Municipality
Deaths from the COVID-19 pandemic in Canada